The 1962 United States House of Representatives elections was an election for the United States House of Representatives on November 6, 1962, to elect members to serve in the 88th United States Congress. They occurred in the middle of President John F. Kennedy's term. As in most midterm elections, Kennedy's Democratic Party lost seats to the opposition Republican Party, but retained a majority. House Democrats were expected to lose their majority, but the resolution over the Cuban Missile Crisis just a few weeks prior led to a rebound in approval for the Democrats under President Kennedy.

The number of seats up for election went back to 435, in accordance with reapportionment resulting from the 1960 census. The membership had been increased temporarily to 437 in 1959, providing 1 seat each for the new states of Alaska and Hawaii, while the other 435 seats continued with the reapportionment resulting from the 1950 census.

This was the last midterm election cycle until 2022 in which a sitting Democratic president experienced net losses for his party in the House while experiencing net gains in the Senate.

Overall results

Special elections 

Elections are listed by date and district.

Alabama 

Alabama lost 1 seat in redistricting and elected all seats at-large as a method of determining which seat to eliminate.

Alaska

Arizona 

Arizona gained one seat and formed a new third district out of the northern part of the state.

Arkansas 

Arkansas lost two seats and merged the 5th and 6th districts into the other districts. 5th district incumbent Dale Alford chose to run for governor rather than face Wilbur Mills in a primary, and 6th district incumbent Catherine Dorris Norrell retired after serving out the remainder of her husband's term.

California 

Eight new seats were gained in reapportionment, including 4 additional districts in Greater Los Angeles alone as well as others in San Diego, the Northern Central Valley, Alameda County, and the Central Coast, increasing the delegation from 30 to 38 seats. Seven of the new seats were won by Democrats, one by a Republican. Two Republican incumbents lost re-election to Democrats. Therefore, Democrats increased by 9 seats and Republicans decreased by 1.

Colorado

Connecticut

Delaware

Florida 

Florida gained 4 new districts at reapportionment: the 3rd around Miami, the 9th in the Panhandle, the 10th around Tampa, and the 11th in Orlando and the nearby Atlantic coast.

Georgia

Hawaii 

Hawaii gained a second seat at reapportionment and elected both seats at-large.

Idaho

Illinois 

Illinois lost one seat at reapportionment, merging the existing 21st district into the 20th and 23rd, and the Chicago districts were realigned to give more representation to the suburbs.

Indiana

Iowa 

Iowa lost one seat at reapportionment and divided the existing 6th district in north-central Iowa among several neighboring districts with compensating boundary changes elsewhere. Incumbent Merwin Coad chose to retire rather than run against one of the other incumbents.

Kansas 

Kansas lost one seat at reapportionment and redistricted from 6 to 5, combining the existing southwestern 5th and northwestern 6th districts into a single district, in which incumbents James Floyd Breeding and Bob Dole ran against each other, and making modest boundary changes elsewhere.

Kentucky 

Kentucky lost one seat at reapportionment. 5th district incumbent Brent Spence elected to retire, and his district was divided between several other districts with the lion's share going to the 4th.

Louisiana

Maine 

Maine lost one seat at reapportionment, redistricting from 3 seats to 2 -- a 1st district containing the coastal parts of the existing 1st and 2nd districts, and a 2nd district containing the existing 3rd district and the rest of inland Maine.

Maryland 

Maryland gained an eighth seat at reapportionment and chose to elect it at-large.

Massachusetts 

Massachusetts lost two seats at reapportionment, one from each party.

Michigan 

Michigan gained one seat at reapportionment, which it elected at-large rather than redistricting.

Minnesota 

Minnesota lost one seat at reapportionment, and the 7th saw the largest change, with its territory split between the existing 2nd and 6th districts.

Mississippi 

Mississippi lost one seat at reapportionment, and merged the 2nd and 3rd districts without making other boundary changes.

Missouri 

Missouri lost one seat at reapportionment, and merged the 11th and 8th districts with compensating boundary changes to other districts.

Montana

Nebraska 

Nebraska lost one seat at reapportionment and split the southern 1st district between the eastern 3rd and western 4th districts.

Nevada

New Hampshire

New Jersey 

New Jersey gained one seat and formed a 15th district out of parts of the existing 3rd and 5th districts around Perth Amboy without making substantial changes elsewhere.

New Mexico

New York 

New York lost 2 seats at reapportionment; after redistricting, Long Island actually gained two seats while Manhattan lost two and Brooklyn and Upstate New York lost one each. As of 2020, this would be the last time Republicans would win the most congressional districts in New York.

North Carolina

North Dakota

Ohio

Oklahoma

Oregon

Pennsylvania 

Three seats were lost in reapportionment, decreasing the delegation from 30 to 27 seats, with redistricting removing one seat in Philadelphia and two in central Pennsylvania. Two of those seats were lost by Republicans (a retirement and a redistricting contest against a Democratic incumbent), and one seat was by a Democrat (a retirement).

Rhode Island

South Carolina

South Dakota

Tennessee

Texas 

Texas gained one seat in reapportionment and elected it at large.

Utah

Vermont

Virginia

Washington

West Virginia 

West Virginia lost one seat and redistricted from 6 districts to 5, splitting the existing 3rd district up among all the others.

Wisconsin

Wyoming

See also
 1962 United States elections
 1962 United States Senate elections
 87th United States Congress
 88th United States Congress

Notes

References